Broadcast News may refer to:
News, the communication of selected information on current events
Broadcast News (film), a 1987 movie
Broadcast journalism, the field of electronically published news and journals
Broadcast News (Canada), a subsidiary of the Canadian Press news agency
Canadian Press Cable Service (formerly CableStream), a TV service referred to as "Broadcast News"